Carmen Joan Duncan (7 July 1942 – 3 February 2019) was an Australian-born stage and screen actress and activist, with a career locally and internationally in the United States that spanned over 50 years.

She was nominated for the AFI Award for Best Actress for the 1980 film Harlequin, and was also known for the film Don't Let It Get You. Her other film appearances include Touch and Go (1980) and Turkey Shoot (1982). She played Iris Wheeler in the American soap opera Another World from 1988 to 1994.

Duncan appeared in numerous theatre roles from 1970 and 2015

Early life and career
Duncan was born in Cooma, New South Wales, in 1942. She graduated in 1961 from the National Institute of Dramatic Art (NIDA) in Sydney. Duncan was known to Australian audiences as a character actress in television, stage and films, as well as having appeared in television commercials. Her television roles included the series Hunter (1967) and she appeared in the evening soap opera Number 96 playing Helen Sheridan in 1973. A role on the soap Certain Women followed. She later had an ongoing role in Skyways, and guest starred in several episodes of A Country Practice as Terence Elliott's wife, Rowena. Her film roles included Turkey Shoot (1982) and its 2014 reboot.

Duncan emigrated to the United States in the 1980s, where she acted on television. From October 1988 to September 1994, she portrayed Iris Carrington Wheeler on the daytime soap opera Another World. 
Duncan became a member of Actor's Equity in 1962 and the federal council of the Media and Entertainment Arts Alliance.

Activism
Duncan retired from acting in 2006 and became a fundraising manager for the GO Fund, a New South Wales charity associated with gynaecological cancer. She served as an ambassador for the Breast Care Centre at the Royal Hospital for Women.

Personal life 
Duncan lived in Sydney. She had two children. Her younger sister is actress Paula Duncan.

Carmen Duncan died on 3 February 2019 from breast cancer, aged 76.

FILM

TELEVISION

STAGE/THEATRE
 Make Me A Widow (1963)
 Hamlet (1963)
 Playboy Of The Western World (1965)
 A Man for All Seasons (1965)
 A Scent Of Flowers (1971)
 After The Fall (1972)
 Cactus Flower (1972)
 Cat On A Hot Tin Roof (1973)
 Romeo And Juliet (1974)
 Next (1977)
 Bedroom Farce (1978)
 Top Girls (1983)
 Blithe Spirit (1987)
 Agatha Christie's A Murder Is Announced (2013)
 The Credeaux Canvas (2015)

Filmography

Feature films
Hotel Mumbai (2018)
Turkey Shoot (2014)
Liquid Bridge (2003)

Turkey Shoot (1982)
Touch and Go (1980)
Harlequin (1980)

You Can't See 'round Corners (1969)
Don't Let It Get You (1966)

Television
Winners & Losers (2011)
As the World Turns (2004)
CrashBurn (2003)
Always Greener (2003)

Water Rats (2001)
All Saints (2000)

Another World (1988–1994)
The Flying Doctors (TV series)

A Country Practice (1982–1986)

Skyways (1979)

Cop Shop (1978)

Number 96 (1973)

Homicide (1966–1973)

Matlock Police (1972)

Division 4 (1970)

Riptide (1969)

Hunter (1967)
You Can't See 'Round Corners (1967)

References

External links

Irises: The Unofficial Beverlee McKinsey and Carmen Duncan Home Page

1942 births
2019 deaths
Australian film actresses
Australian soap opera actresses
People from Cooma
Actresses from New South Wales
Deaths from breast cancer
Deaths from cancer in New South Wales
Drama teachers
Australian emigrants to the United States
20th-century Australian actresses
21st-century Australian actresses